United Nations Security Council Resolution 25, adopted on May 22, 1947, recommended Italy's application for admission to the United Nations to the Committee on the Admission of New Members for "study and report to the Security Council at the appropriate time".

The resolution was adopted ten votes to none, while Australia abstained. Italy would later be admitted as a full UN member at SCR 109 in 1955.

See also
List of United Nations Security Council Resolutions 1 to 100 (1946–1953)

References
Text of the Resolution at undocs.org

External links
 

 0025
 0025
 0025
1947 in Italy
May 1947 events